Robin Moger is a British translator of Arabic literature. His translations include:

 Ahmed Mourad - Vertigo
 Hamdi Abu Golayel - A Dog With No Tail
 Maan Abu Taleb - All The Battles 
 Mohammad Rabie - Otared 
 Nael Eltoukhy - Women of Karantina
 Yasser Abdel Hafez - The Book of Safety 
 Yousef Al-Mohaimeed - Where Pigeons Don't Fly 
 Youssef Rakha - The Crocodiles

He won the 2017 Banipal Prize for his translation of The Book of Safety by Yasser Abdel Hafez. He lives in Cape Town.

References

South African translators
Year of birth missing (living people)
Living people